Hasiru Thorana is a 1970 Indian Kannada language drama film directed by T. V. Singh Thakur and written by Sundaramma. It stars Rajkumar, Udaykumar and Bharathi Vishnuvardhan. The film was released under Sri Indira Movies banner and produced by Y. Anantharama Rao. The film, featuring the soundtrack composed by Upendra Kumar was received well upon release.

Cast 
 Rajkumar as Madhu
 Udaykumar as Soori
 Bharathi Vishnuvardhan as Meena
 Narasimharaju as Apatbandhava
 Pandari Bai as Savitri
 Ganapathi Bhat
 B. Raghavendra Rao
 M. Jayashree as Jayashree
 H. R. Shastry

Soundtrack 
The music of the film was composed by Upendra Kumar and lyrics for the soundtrack written by R. N. Jayagopal and G. V. Iyer.

Track list

See also
 Kannada films of 1970

References

External links 
 

1970 films
1970s Kannada-language films
Indian black-and-white films
Indian drama films